Trio (also known as W. Somerset Maugham's Trio) is a 1950 British anthology film based on three short stories by W. Somerset Maugham: "The Verger", "Mr Know-All" and "Sanatorium". Ken Annakin directed "The Verger" and "Mr Know-All", while Harold French was responsible for "Sanatorium".

Trio is the second of a film trilogy, all consisting of adaptations of Maugham's stories, preceded by the 1948 Quartet and followed by the 1951 Encore. Production budget of the film was shared by the J. Arthur Rank Organization and Paramount.

The film was nominated for the Academy Award for Best Sound, Recording (Cyril Crowhurst) and was the final one released under the Gainsborough Pictures banner.

Plot

The Verger
The new vicar at St Peter's Church is astonished to learn that the long-serving verger, Albert Foreman, is illiterate. Foreman is too set in his ways to want to learn to read and write, and the vicar feels he has no choice but to sack him. Foreman's savings, while substantial, are not enough to sustain him for the rest of his life. On the way back to his lodgings, Foreman notices that there is no tobacconist's shop in the area and decides to open one. He also proposes to his landlady Emma. Their shop is so successful that when his stepdaughter's husband loses his job Foreman sets up another shop for them to run. Over the next ten years, Foreman starts up ten shops and becomes wealthy. The bank manager recommends that Foreman invest his savings, causing him to reveal that he cannot read the necessary papers. The manager exclaims, "What would you be today if you had been able to?" Foreman replies that he would be the verger at St Peter's.

Mr Know-All
Reserved Mr Gray finds himself forced to share a cabin on an ocean liner with the loud, opinionated, supremely self-confident gem dealer Max Kelada. Kelada soon dominates all the onboard social gatherings, much to the annoyance of his fellow passengers, who take to calling him "Mr Know-All" behind his back because of his insistence that he is an expert on all subjects. One night, Kelada remarks on the fine quality of the pearl necklace worn by Mrs Ramsay, who has rejoined her husband after a two-year separation caused by his work. Mr Ramsay bets Kelada ten pounds that the pearls are fake. Kelada accepts the wager, despite Mrs Ramsay's attempt to call it off. While he is examining the pearls Kelada observes that the woman is very uneasy. He then says that he was wrong and pays Mr Ramsay. Afterwards, back in their cabin, Gray and Kelada are surprised when two five-pound notes are slipped under their door in an envelope. Gray gets Kelada to tell the truth: the pearls are real and very costly. Kelada adds that he would not have left such an attractive wife alone for that long. Gray begins to warm to his cabin mate.

Sanatorium
This segment is based on "Sanatorium", which was first published in Ashenden: Or the British Agent.

Mr Ashenden is sent to a sanatorium for patients of Tuberculosis (which was often fatal  at that time until the advent of anti-biotics) and becomes acquainted with the other residents. Another newcomer is Major George Templeton, who admires the lovely Evie Bishop. Evie has spent years in one sanatorium after another. Ashenden also observes the feud between two long-term patients, Mr Campbell and Mr McLeod, who delight in making each other's lives miserable. One more patient, Mr Chester, resents the visits of his wife because he envies her robust good health. McLeod dies, depriving Campbell of his enjoyment of life. After George and Evie fall in love the doctors warn them that George will hasten his death if they marry, but they decide that happiness, no matter how brief, is worth the price. Their example eases Mr Chester's bitterness about his own fate.

Cast

The Verger
 James Hayter as Albert Foreman
 Kathleen Harrison as Emma Foreman (née Brown)
 Michael Hordern as the vicar
 Felix Aylmer as the bank manager
 Lana Morris as Gladys, Emma's daughter
 Glyn Houston as Ted, Gladys's husband

Mr. Know-All
 Nigel Patrick as Max Kelada
 Wilfred Hyde-White as Mr Gray
 Anne Crawford as Mrs Ramsay
 Naunton Wayne as Mr Ramsay
 Clive Morton as the ship's captain
 Bill Travers as Fellowes (credited as Bill Linden-Travers)

Sanatorium
 Michael Rennie as Major George Templeton
 Jean Simmons as Evie Bishop
 Roland Culver as Mr Ashenden
 André Morell as Dr Lennox
 John Laurie as Mr Campbell
 Finlay Currie as Mr McLeod
 Betty Ann Davies as Mrs Chester
 Raymond Huntley as Henry Chester

Production
Director Harold French enjoyed doing the film although he later said he should have concentrated on the illness of the central characters more than the romance. He said Guy Rolfe was originally cast but had to drop out due to consumption and was replaced by Michael Rennie.

Reception

Critical
Bosley Crowther described the film as "another delightful screen potpourri, made from short stories of W. Somerset Maugham ... Wonderfully rich ... Shot through with keen, ironic humor". TV Guide called it "a small and highly enjoyable film".

Box office
Trade papers called the film a "notable box office attraction" in British cinemas in 1950. According to Kinematograph Weekly the 'biggest winners' at the box office in 1950 Britain were The Blue Lamp, The Happiest Days of Your Life, Annie Get Your Gun, The Wooden Horse, Treasure Island and Odette, with "runners up" being Stage Fright, White Heat, They Were Not Divided, Trio, Morning Departure, Destination Moon, Sands of Iwo Jima, Little Women, The Forsythe Saga, Father of the Bride, Neptune's Daughter, The Dancing Years, The Red Light, Rogues of Sherwood Forest, Fancy Pants, Copper Canyon, State Secret, The Cure for Love, My Foolish Heart, Stromboli, Cheaper by the Dozen, Pinky, Three Came Home, Broken Arrow and Black Rose.

References

External links
 
 
 
 

1950 films
1950 comedy-drama films
British comedy-drama films
British anthology films
British black-and-white films
Films based on short fiction
Films directed by Ken Annakin
Films directed by Harold French
Films shot at Pinewood Studios
Films based on works by W. Somerset Maugham
Films about tuberculosis
Films based on multiple works
Films with screenplays by Noel Langley
1950s English-language films
1950s British films